Bulandshahr Assembly constituency is one of the 403 constituencies of the Uttar Pradesh Legislative Assembly, India. It is a part of the Bulandshahar district and one of the five assembly constituencies in the Bulandshahr Lok Sabha constituency. First election in this assembly constituency was held in 1952 after the "DPACO (1951)" (delimitation order) was passed in 1951. After the "Delimitation of Parliamentary and Assembly Constituencies Order" was passed in 2008, the constituency was assigned identification number 65.

Wards / Areas
Extent of Bulandshahr Assembly constituency is KC Baran, PCs  Luharli, Joligarh, Akhtayarpur, Sharifpur Bhainsroli, Lohgra, Ginora Shekh,  Nimchana, Agouta, Sihi, Khangawali, Karimnagar Banboi, Partabpur,  Salavatnagar Gangawali, Aulena of Agouta KC & Bulandshahr MB of  Bulandshahr Tehsil.

Members of the Legislative Assembly

Election results

2022

2020

16th Vidhan Sabha: 2012 General Elections

See also
Bulandshahr Lok Sabha constituency
Bulandshahar district
Sixteenth Legislative Assembly of Uttar Pradesh
Uttar Pradesh Legislative Assembly

References

External links
 

Assembly constituencies of Uttar Pradesh
Constituencies established in 1951
1951 establishments in Uttar Pradesh
Bulandshahr
Politics of Bulandshahr district